USS Tuscumbia is a name used more than once by the U.S. Navy:

 , a gunboat in the United States Navy during the American Civil War.
 , a tugboat launched in November 1945.

References 

United States Navy ship names